Philip Anthony Charnock (born 14 February 1975) is an English former footballer who played as a midfielder. As of 2022, he remains Liverpool's youngest ever player to feature in European competition.

He began his career at Liverpool, and made his debut at the age of 17 years and nine months to become the youngest player ever to play for the club in European competition. However, he did not play a league game for the "Reds", and after a loan spell to Blackpool in 1996, he signed with Crewe Alexandra in December 1996. He helped the "Railwaymen" to win the Second Division play-offs in 1997, but injuries hampered his progress at the club, and he was released and signed with Port Vale in August 2002. He moved on to Bury in August 2003, before moving on to Linfield the following month. The club won the IFA Premiership in 2003–04 and finished second the following season, and he moved on to Ballymena United in October 2005. He travelled back to England in summer 2006 for brief spells with non-league clubs Fleetwood Town, Leigh RMI, and Mossley.

Playing career

Liverpool
Charnock began his career with Liverpool, and made his debut under Graeme Souness in November 1992 in a Cup Winners' Cup game against Apollon Limassol. Charnock was just 17 years and 9 months old, which made him the youngest player ever to play for the club in European competition, breaking a record previously set by Jamie Redknapp one year earlier. Despite this promising start, Charnock did not break into the first team at Anfield, instead he spent much of his time in the reserves and his only other appearance for the Reds was in a League Cup tie against Chesterfield that season. With the advent of squad numbers in the Premier League from the 1993–94 season onwards, Charnock was issued with the number 18 shirt – next worn by Michael Owen, who went on to be one of the club's most highly regarded players ever. He joined Blackpool on loan towards the end of the 1995–96 season, and made four substitute appearances for Sam Allardyce's "Tangerines".

Crewe Alexandra
In December 1996 he left Liverpool on a free transfer to sign for Crewe Alexandra, following a successful loan spell. He made 36 appearances in 1996–97, scoring his first senior goal on 20 December, in a 3–0 win over Notts County at Gresty Road. He also featured in the play-off final, as Alex beat Brentford 1–0 at Wembley to win promotion out of the Second Division; he was replaced by Chris Lightfoot on 65 minutes. He made 35 appearances in 1997–98, as Crewe finished in the top half of the First Division. He played 50 games in 1998–99, as the "Railwaymen" again retained their second tier status. He played 21 times at the start of the 1999–2000 campaign, but did not feature past November. He made nine league appearances towards the end of the 2000–01 season and featured 26 times in 2001–02, but was released in April 2002, after manager Dario Gradi informed him he did not feature in his first team plans.

Later career
He moved on to nearby Port Vale in August 2002. He featured 24 times for Brian Horton's "Valiants" in 2002–03, before he was released from Vale Park in May 2003. He joined Bury in August 2003, but played just three Third Division games for Andy Preece's "Shakers" in 2003–04 in a brief stay at Gigg Lane. In September 2003 he moved to Northern Ireland to play for Linfield. His new club won the IFA Premiership title in 2003–04 and finished second in 2004–05. In October 2005 he joined Ballymena United on a short-term contract, which was extended after some good performances. He suffered with injury at both Irish clubs, missing a whole year of action, and he returned to England in summer 2006, joining Fleetwood Town of the Northern Premier League Premier Division. A year later, Charnock signed for Conference North team Leigh RMI. He played just 12 games, as Leigh finished bottom of the league in 2007–08, and were thus relegated. He signed for Mossley in July 2008. He made just five appearances for the Northern Premier League club in 2008–09, before injuries curtailed his career completely.

Coaching career
Charnock returned to Liverpool in 2012 as the coach for the under-12 side and went on to work across the age groups at the Academy.

Career statistics
Source:

Honours
Crewe Alexandra
Football League Second Division play-offs: 1997

Linfield
IFA Premiership: 2003–04

References

1975 births
Living people
Footballers from Southport
English footballers
Association football midfielders
Liverpool F.C. players
Blackpool F.C. players
Crewe Alexandra F.C. players
Port Vale F.C. players
Bury F.C. players
Linfield F.C. players
Ballymena United F.C. players
Fleetwood Town F.C. players
Leigh Genesis F.C. players
Mossley A.F.C. players
English Football League players
NIFL Premiership players
Northern Premier League players
National League (English football) players
Association football coaches
Liverpool F.C. non-playing staff